Coady Andrews (born January 31, 1989) is a former American soccer player who last played for Oklahoma City Energy.

Career
After splitting time with MidAmerica Nazarene University and University of Missouri–Kansas City, Andrews spent time with Missouri Comets of the Major Indoor Soccer League.

In 2013, Andrews joined USL Pro club Harrisburg City Islanders and made his debut on April 13 in a 2-1 victory over Pittsburgh Riverhounds.

References

External links
MISL Profile

1989 births
Living people
American soccer players
Kansas City Brass players
Missouri Comets players
Des Moines Menace players
Penn FC players
OKC Energy FC players
Association football defenders
Soccer players from Kansas
USL League Two players
Major Indoor Soccer League (2008–2014) players
USL Championship players
People from Shawnee, Kansas
Sportspeople from Kansas City, Kansas 	
Kansas City Roos men's soccer players